John Teunis Bergen (1786 – March 9, 1855) was an American slave owner, law enforcement officer, newspaperman, and politician who served one term as a United States representative from New York from 1831 to 1833.

Biography
Born in Gowanus, Brooklyn, Bergen was the son of Teunis Hans and Antje Cornelius Vanderve, and second cousin to Teunis Garret Bergen, U.S. Representative from New York as well as a historian. He married Margaret Donald Mcleod
who died in 1814. His second wife was Maria F. Mcleod.
 
Appointed a lieutenant in the New York State Militia in 1812, Bergen was promoted to captain in 1815 and served in the War of 1812.

Early career 
Bergen was Sheriff of Kings County, New York, from 1821 to 1825 and again from 1828 until 1831 when he resigned. He purchased the Long Island Patriot in 1829, the name of which was subsequently changed to the Brooklyn Advocate, and which ultimately became the Brooklyn Daily Eagle.

Congress 
Elected as a Jacksonian to the twenty-second Congress, Bergen was U. S. Representative for the second district of New York from March 4, 1831, to March 3, 1833.  While in the House he was chairman of the Committee on Accounts.

Later career and death 
Not a candidate for renomination in 1832, Bergen engaged in agricultural pursuits near Bay Ridge, New Utrecht (now part of Brooklyn). He moved to Brooklyn and engaged in the grocery business. In 1837, with his sons, he conducted a planing mill in New York City. He moved to Genesee County and engaged in agricultural pursuits.

Bergen died in Batavia, New York, on March 9, 1855 (age about 68 years). He is interred at Batavia Cemetery in Batavia, New York.

See also
 Hans Hansen Bergen

References

External links

1786 births
1855 deaths
Politicians from Brooklyn
Bergen family
Jacksonian members of the United States House of Representatives from New York (state)
Sheriffs of Kings County, New York
Brooklyn Eagle
Members of the United States House of Representatives from New York (state)